The Resurrection of Gavin Stone is a 2017 American Christian comedy drama film directed by Dallas Jenkins, written by Andrea Gyertson Nasfell, and starring Brett Dalton, Anjelah Johnson-Reyes, Neil Flynn, Shawn Michaels and D. B. Sweeney. The film was released on January 20, 2017, by WWE Studios and Blumhouse Tilt.

Plot
Former child star Gavin Stone is now a washed-up, partied-out man. When he is forced to return home, he pretends to be a Christian so he can portray Jesus in an Easter play being produced by a megachurch.

Cast 
 Brett Dalton as Gavin Stone
 Anjelah Johnson-Reyes as Kelly Richardson
 Neil Flynn as Waylon Stone
 Shawn Michaels as Doug
 D. B. Sweeney as Pastor Allen Richardson
 Tim Frank as John Mark
 Liam Matthews as Charles 
 Christopher Maleki as Mike Meara 
 Patrick Gagnon as Anthony

Release 
On July 29, 2015, it was announced that WWE Studios had acquired worldwide rights to the faith-based comedy from Vertical Church Films. On July 20, 2016, Vertical Church Films announced that the film would be released on January 20, 2017.

Critical response
On Rotten Tomatoes, the film has an approval rating of 54% based on 13 reviews and an average rating of 5.3/10. On Metacritic, the film has a score 36 out of 100 based on 5 critics, indicating "generally unfavorable reviews".

References

External links
 

2017 films
American comedy-drama films
2017 comedy-drama films
Films about actors
Films about Christianity
Walden Media films
WWE Studios films
Blumhouse Productions films
2017 drama films
2010s English-language films
2010s American films